The Ridgetop Shawnee Tribe of Indians is a limited liability company, nonprofit organization, and unrecognized tribe in Kentucky. They are Americans who identify as being of Shawnee ancestry.

Nonprofit organization 
In June 2013 the Pine Mountain Indian Community, LLC, announced that the Ridgetop group would be renamed as the Ridgetop Shawnee, to serve as the heritage arm of this nonprofit organization. Within this new management structure, the Ridgetop Shawnee would concentrate on preservation and protection of the heritage of the region. The Pine Mountain Indian Community would focus on economic development and community development in Southeastern Kentucky.

William Hayes Shackleford founded the Ridgetop Shawnee Tribe of Indians, LLC, as a limited liability company and nonprofit organization, based in Hazard, Kentucky, in 2009. The organization went inactive but became active again in 2021, with Jeffery R. Morgan serving as its registered agent.

Shackleford organized the Pine Mountain Indian Community, Kentucky LLC in 2013, also a nonprofit limited liability company in Hazard, Kentucky. This organization dissolved in September 2015. Morgan served as this organization's registered agent.

Politics 
The Absentee Shawnee Tribal Historic Preservation Office's Cultural Preservation Department wrote that "in our ancestral settlement areas including but not limited to Ohio, Kentucky, West Virginia, Indiana, [and] Alabama. In these areas, there are a number of people who claim Shawnee ancestry, this is not so much the concern as the fact that some of these individuals or groups use this claim to exploit Shawnee culture as a means of gaining opportunities for themselves from a public that is largely unaware of the vast divide that separates our tribal community politically and culturally from those of alleged Shawnee ancestry" and goes on to name the Ridgetop Shawnee among several similar groups.

Since the late 20th century, the Ridgetop Shawnee Tribe contributed to the passage of local ordinances that prohibit digging, or artifact hunting, on county and city lands. One such ordinance was passed by the Harlan County, Kentucky fiscal court in 2006. The only such ordinance in the Commonwealth of Kentucky, it has decreased illegal artifact hunting and helped preserve prehistoric sites. The Ridgetop Shawnee Tribe of Indians were instrumental in the creation of the Harlan County Native American Site Protection Office. They gained agreement from the city of Ashland, Kentucky, to put a protective fence around prehistoric earthworks in a park; the site is listed on the National Register of Historic Places as the Indian Mounds in Central Park.

In 2009 and 2010, the State House of the Kentucky General Assembly recognized the Ridgetop Shawnee Tribe of Indians by passing, unopposed, House Joint Resolutions 15 or HJR-15 in 2009 and HJR-16 in 2010. These acknowledged the civic contributions of the group.

Language 
The tribe is seeking to preserve the Shawnee language, a Central Algonquian language that was traditional for many members' ancestors.

Membership 
The Ridgetop Shawnee require that prospective members prove documented descent from multiracial settlers in the region from 1790–1870, and also have Y-DNA or MtDNA showing direct-line Native American ancestry. Y-DNA and or MtDNA may be used only to show descent from individuals who are documented as eligible for enrollment. In 2012 the Ridgetop Shawnee began the Express Enrollment program for descendants of several family lines of mixed-Native American heritage, who have been well-documented as migrating to Southeastern Kentucky, Northeastern Tennessee, and Southwestern Virginia in the late 18th and early 19th centuries. These families and lines are: Sizemore (KY); Fields (KY, VA); descendants of Hawkins Bowman (KY, VA); descendants of Ezekiel Bennett (KY, TN); descendants of John Cole (KY, VA); and descendants of Porter Jackson (KY, VA).

See also
 Absentee-Shawnee Tribe of Indians of Oklahoma
 Eastern Shawnee Tribe of Oklahoma
 Shawnee Tribe

References

External links
 Ridgetop Shawnee Tribe of Indians

Cultural organizations based in Kentucky
2009 establishments in Kentucky
Unrecognized tribes in the United States
Harlan County, Kentucky
Shawnee heritage groups